The town of Calais, now part of France, was in English hands from 1347 to 1558, and this page lists the commanders of Calais, holding office from the English Crown, called at different times Captain of Calais, King's Lieutenant of Calais (Castle), or Lord Deputy of Calais.

Terminology and background
Commands were over the castle of Calais, the town, the march and its outlying castles; command was often divided, and deputies frequently appointed for commanders who might be absent. The terminology was flexible, changed over time, and may not be accurately given in some sources. The military, political and even financial situation, and the presence or absence of officers, did affect how the system operated. The terms used changed over nearly two centuries. The system of royal officials set up after Edward III took Calais consisted of captain, marshal, seneschal and constable. But changes were soon seen.

Calais refers properly here to the Pale of Calais, or March of Calais, part of the Kingdom of England, namely the English bridgehead area between the County of Artois and County of Flanders; it varied in area according to the military position. The boundary took in wetlands and was not always clear, but the area amounted to about 20 square miles.

The approaches to Calais, which is a port on the coast, were defended by two inland castles, that of Guînes, somewhat to the south-east, and Hammes (Hampnes, Hammez) in the present commune of Hames-Boucres, somewhat to the southwest. Calais had also castellans (of Calais Castle); "Captain of Calais Castle" is a different post from "Captain of Calais", the title of the top commander and military governor of the Pale for most of the period.

Deputies
When "deputy" is used, it may or may not mean a second-in-command: there is no consistency across the period. From Latin records there come "vice" (in the place of) or "locum tenens" (holding the place of). "Lieutenant" is a direct French translation of "locum tenens"; it means generally the second-in-command to the "captain" or head commander. There is a mention of a "deputy lieutenant", however. Caveats are required because a "lord deputy" has to be understood as deputy to the king; and the term "deputy governor" should usually be read "lord deputy and governor", not "deputy to the governor".

The Lord Deputy of Calais, a Tudor title only, was the English king's representative and head of the Council of Calais. The title of Lord Deputy was used in Calais only from 1507. The Council existed in some form under Edward IV, and lasted until the French conquest of Calais in 1558. There could be more than one Deputy holding the title at a given time.

In practical terms the Lord Deputy was also the military governor of Calais, but the two posts were not formally the same: in 1552 Lord William Howard became "lord deputy and governor of Calais". "Governor of Calais" may also refer to the French post after 1558.

Captains and lieutenants of Calais

Lords deputies of Calais

See also
Treasurer of Calais

References
R. A. Griffiths, The Reign of Henry VI (1998)

Notes

History of Calais